The 2009 PEI Labatt Tankard (Prince Edward Island's men's provincial curling championship) was held February 10-15 at the Montague Curling Club in Montague, Prince Edward Island. The winning team will represent Prince Edward Island at the 2009 Tim Hortons Brier in Calgary.

Teams

Standings

Results

Draw 1
February 10, 1900

Draw 2
February 11, 1400

Draw 3
February 11, 2000

Draw 4
February 12, 1400

Draw 5
February 12, 1900

Draw 6
February 13, 1400

Draw 7
February 13, 1900

Tiebreakers
February 14, 0900

February 14, 1400

Playoffs

1 vs. 2
February 14, 1900

3 vs. 4
February 14, 1900

Semi-final
February 15, 1000

Final
February 15, 1500

External links
Montague Curling Club

Labatt Tankard